Babi Badalov (born 18 June 1959) is an Azerbaijani visual artist and poet. Since 2011 he lives and works in Paris, France.

Life and work 
Babi Badalov was born as Babakhan Badalov in Lerik, a small town near the Iranian border in the Talysh region of Azerbaijan, to an Azeri father and a Talysh mother. Badalov participated in numerous art shows with the group in Russia and abroad. In the late 1980s, he met artists Vadim Ovchinnikov and Timur Novikov, members of the New Artists Group, and became involved in a variety of their projects and art campaigns.

Badalov always found different ways of expressing his ideas through art objects, paintings, installations and live performances. He also tested himself on the movie set of avant-garde Russian film director Evgeniy Kondratiev. In addition to his visual explorations, Badalov experiments with words and writes obscure poetry, mixing the languages and mentalities of different cultures. Even though Russian is not his first language, he won the  poetry contest.

In 1990, Badalov mysteriously disappeared from the Leningrad art scene and became a legendary figure, and an inspiration and a role model for younger generations of Russian artists.

Today, Badalov continues to exhibit around the world and develop his new ideas. His latest concept was a series of ecological art objects called Dolls for Adults, where he isolated the plastic of nature inside his own clothes. He is also working on a number of visual projects dedicated to linguistic explorations, questioning how a person can become the victim of a language barrier, trying to untangle the confusion of the Cyrillic/Latin mix.

In 2007, world-renowned Moscow-based art critic and curator Victor Misiano invited Badalov to take part in a number of exhibitions, where he displayed his audio-visual projects.

In 2011, Badalov was granted asylum in France due to threats of an honor killing in Azerbaijan because of his homosexuality.

In 2019, his work was shown in the group exhibition Hotel Europa: Their Past, Your Present, Our Future at Open Space of Experimental Art, Tbilisi, and in the two solo exhibitions Soul Mobilisation at La Verrière - Fondation d'entreprise Hermès, Brussels and Het is of de stenen spreken (silence is a commons) at Casco Art Institute, Utrecht.

Publications 
 1990: Jule Reuter, GegenKunst in Leningrad, München, 
 1993: Jean-Pierre Brossard; Boris Smelov; Manoir de la ville de Martigny.; et al., Saint-Petersbourg Alter, 
 2011: Bart De Baere, Europe at large: art from the former USSR, 
 2012: Babi Badalov, Nuage, 
 2013: The Collection as a Character, The M HKA Collection, 
 2014: Catalog Tranzit Exhibition, Jan 22-Apr 13, New Museum

References

External links 
 
 Babi Badalov's blog
 Babi Badalov's Visual Poetry
 Exhibition Monument to Transformation, May 2009, Prague
 В Санкт-Петербурге прошла выставка азербайджанского художника-концептуалиста Баби Бадалова
 Braziers Workshop
 Very Simple Actions without Any Particular Purpose, 2009, ARTRA gallery, Milan
 Wings of Time, Zamanin Qanadlari, Baku, Azerbaijan
 Web page of New Museum exhibition
 Web page exhibition Easteria, Gandy gallery, 10 Mar - 9 May 2014
 Huffington Post article on exhibition in the New Museum
 Manifesta 8 web page with some of Babi's poems

1959 births
Living people
Azerbaijani people of Talysh descent
Azerbaijani poets
Azerbaijani artists
Gay painters
Gay poets
20th-century Azerbaijani painters
21st-century Azerbaijani painters
Azerbaijani emigrants to France
Artists from Saint Petersburg
Azerbaijani LGBT people
Talysh people
21st-century LGBT people